Hazel Renée Monaghan (born 12 July 1992) is an English actress.

Early life 
Monaghan was born in Grenoble, France.

Career 
Monaghan became a member of the National Youth Theatre in 2005. She trained at the Central Junior Television Workshop in Nottingham. She made her television debut as Mo in Bernard's Watch, in the episode "The Right Time". She is best known for her role as 'Mina' in the BBC's adaptation of Tim Pears' novel In a Land of Plenty. In 2001, she played Sarah in Miramax Films' Gypsy Woman.

Filmography

References

1992 births
Living people
Actresses from Grenoble
Actors from Nottingham
English people of Lebanese descent
English people of Scottish descent
English stage actresses
English television actresses
English film actresses
French people of Lebanese descent
French people of Scottish descent
National Youth Theatre members
20th-century English actresses
21st-century English actresses
20th-century French women